Maras or Maraş (pronounced Marash) may refer to:

Places
 Maraş, a city in Turkey – in 1973 renamed Kahramanmaraş and is the administrative center of Kahramanmaraş Province
 Maras, Iran (disambiguation), places in Iran
 Maras, Peru, a town in Peru near Cuzco
 Maraş, the Turkish name for the Varosha quarter of Famagusta in Northern Cyprus
 Salepi Maraş, a type of salep from the Kahramanmaraş region
 Nor Marash, meaning New Marash, an Armenian neighborhood in Bourj Hammoud, Lebanon named after Maraş in Turkey

Other uses
 Maras (surname)
 Māras, a Latvian festival

See also
 Mara (disambiguation)
 Marash (disambiguation)
 Maravilla (disambiguation)